The Japanese Journal of Religious Studies is a biannual open access journal of research on religion in Japan. It was established in 1960 as Contemporary Religions in Japan by the International Institute for the Study of Religions in Tokyo and published until 1970. It was revived under its current name in 1974 and has since been published by the Nanzan Institute for Religion and Culture since 1981.

See also 
 Asian Ethnology

References

External links 
 

Religion in Japan
Japanese studies journals
Publications established in 1960
English-language journals
Open access journals
Biannual journals
Religious studies journals